The Hollywood District (originally Hollyrood, after the Scottish Holyrood) is a neighborhood of northeast Portland, Oregon, United States renamed for its historic 1920s-era Hollywood Theatre.

Neighborhood
Although a mixed commercial and residential area, Hollywood serves primarily as a shopping district to the adjacent neighborhoods of Grant Park and Laurelhurst, as well as to riders of the MAX Light Rail System.  The Hollywood District also figures in Beverly Cleary's Klickitat Street series of books, a fact memorialized in a display at the Hollywood Library, which also provides a Beverly Cleary walking tour.  The first pedestrian crossing light in Oregon was installed in the Hollywood District, across the street from the Hollywood theater.

The Hollywood District was originally part of the Rose City Park subdivision which was platted in 1907.  The original Rose City Park subdivision was part of the Donation Land Claim of Joseph Backenstos.  The land was later assigned to his widow by U.S. President Andrew Johnson in 1866. 1890s-era maps refer to the area as the Crook Tract.

In the 20th century, the now-defunct Rodgers store chain had its headquarters (as well as its largest store) in the Hollywood District from 1955 to 1984.

The Hollywood District is home to the Hollywood Farmers Market, a year-round Saturday farmers' market located on NE Hancock Street between 44th and 45th Avenues, which runs weekly from April through November, and twice-monthly from December through March. The Hollywood Boosters started "Hollywood at Night" in summer of 2006.  This is a monthly neighborhood event that takes place on the third Thursday of every month to bring together residents and local businesses.

Portland Fashion Institute is also located in the Hollywood District. Founded in 2010, PFI focuses on design, technology and business connected to the fashion industry and is Oregon’s only accredited fashion design school.

Notes

Further reading
Rose City Park Neighborhood History Book: celebrating 90 years since the platting of the Rose City Park subdivision in 1907 (1997, 4th addition); Rose City Park Neighborhood Association, 47 p., Maps.

External links

 Hollywood Neighborhood Association
 Historical Highlights of Hollywood: Hollywood Neighborhood History from Portland State University
 Hollywood Boosters Business Association
 Hollywood Neighborhood Guide from Portlandneighborhood.com
 Northeast Community Center Not-for-profit neighborhood organization providing activities, classes, and fitness facilities
 Hollywood Farmers Market
 Grant Park Neighborhood Association
Street Tree Inventory Report: Hollywood Neighborhood, government of Portland Oregon, September 2016
Portland Fashion Institute

 
Neighborhoods in Portland, Oregon